The NATO Science and Technology Organization (STO) is the primary NATO organization for Defence Science and Technology. Its intent is to maintain NATO's scientific and technological advantage by generating, sharing and utilizing advanced scientific knowledge, technological developments and innovation to support the Alliance's core tasks.

Organization 
The Science and Technology Organization (STO) is a NATO subsidiary body created within the framework of the North Atlantic Treaty signed in Washington in 1949.

The STO provides scientific innovation, advice and solutions to meet NATO's needs through the work of collaborative panels and an executive body that are each composed of well known scientists and experts from NATO and Partner nations.  

The STO operates under the authority of the North Atlantic Council which has delegated the operations of the STO to a Board of Directors (the S&T Board – STB) comprising the NATO Nations S&T managers. The STB is chaired by the NATO Chief Scientist who is a high-level recognized S&T leader of a NATO Nation, being permanently assigned to the NATO Headquarters in Brussels and also serving as the senior scientific advisor to the NATO leadership

The STO is composed of the STB, the Chief Scientist and the following three executive bodies:

 The Office of the Chief Scientist (based in NATO HQ, Brussels, Belgium) providing executive and administrative support to the Chief Scientist in exercising his/her three roles as STB Chairperson, Scientific Advisor and head of the Office
 The Collaboration Support Office (based in Paris, France) providing executive and administrative support to the activities conducted in the framework of the Collaborative business model and its level2 committees and level 3 groups
 The Centre for Maritime Research and Experimentation (based in La Spezia, Italy) organizing and conducting scientific research and technology development and deliver innovative and field tested S&T solutions to address the defence and security needs of the Alliance. Its mission is centered on the maritime domain but it may extrapolate to other domains to meet customers’ demands.

History

From AGARD to RTO 
The Advisory Group for Aerospace Research and Development (AGARD) was formed in 1952 and became an agency under the Military Committee in 1966. Its task was to foster and improve the interchange of information relating to aerospace research and development between the NATO nations. AGARD also provided scientific and technical advice and assistance to the NATO Military Committee in the field of aerospace research and development, with particular regard to military applications.

In a mission statement in the 1982 History it published, the purpose involved "bringing together the leading personalities of the NATO nations in the fields of science and technology relating to aerospace".

The founder and first chairman of AGARD, Dr. Theodore von Kármán, had dedicated his life to the enhancement of understanding and co-operation among scientists of different nations. In 1958 von Kármán hired Moe Berg to accompany him to the AGARD conference in Paris. "AGARD's aim was to encourage European countries to develop weapons technology on their own instead of relying on the U.S. defense industry to do it for them´.

AGARD originally started in 1952 with four Panels (Combustion, Aero-Medicine, Flight Test and Instrumentation, and Wind Tunnel and Model Testing).

Von Kármán had a direct personal interest in the Panels - based on his life-long scientific work and his association with the military - and he gave them his guidance.

At the beginning, there were less than 100 Panel members. Their number grew rapidly to 200 in 1960 and with the expansion to 9 Panels in 1970, there were more than 500 Panel members in the 1990s. After a restructuring in 1994 the number of Panels was reduced to 7, plus a Technical Information Committee (TIC).

Panel members were appointed by their respective National Delegates, normally for a term of 3 years. The detailed areas of interest of each Panel varied rapidly as the field of aerospace science and technology expanded and as interactions between specialist areas became more or less relevant. In very general terms, the mission of each Panel was to fulfil the AGARD mission within its own area of scientific and technical interest and competence.

Each Panel defined a program of meetings and publications in its own specialty, within the general constraints of AGARD policy as determined by the Board. Panel members were responsible for enlisting the necessary support and participation from their own countries. Most Panels held two major meetings each year, which rotated among the NATO Member-Nations. The printing and publication of Panel written works (at that time around 70-90 publications a year) was organised by AGARD Headquarters. Occasionally publications were judged to be of such general interest, that up to 5000 copies were printed.

In January 1998, the need for more cohesion and cost-effectiveness and the need for a single focus in NATO for air, land, sea and space R&T activities resulted in the merger of AGARD and the NATO Defence Research Group (DRG) into the NATO Research and Technology Organization (RTO). The DRG was one of seven "Main Groups" reporting to the Conference of National Armaments Directors (CNAD) whose purpose was to foster cooperation on research and new technology which could lead to future defence equipment.
 
The RTO's executive body was the NATO Research and Technology Agency (RTA), located in Neuilly-sur-Seine, France.

The Science and Technology Organization (STO) 
On 1 July 2012, as a result of NATO Reform, the NATO STO was established merging the RTO with the NATO Undersea Research Centre (NURC) – renamed Center for Maritime Research and Experimentation (CMRE). This combined the expertise and legacy that has been ongoing for over 60 years. The third executive body, the Office of the Chief Scientist (OCS) was created and collocated in NATO Headquarters to improve scientific advice to NATO leadership.

The Panels of the STO 
The total spectrum of the Collaborative Effort is addressed by six Technical Panels who manage a wide range of Scientific Research Activities, a Group specialising in Modeling and Simulation, plus a Committee dedicated to supporting the Information & Knowledge Management needs of the organisation.

These Panels and Group are the power-house of the collaborative model and are made up of national representatives as well as recognised world-class scientists, engineers and information specialists. In addition to providing critical technical oversight, they also provide a communication link to military users and other NATO bodies.

In any given year, there are over 6000 Scientists and Engineers from NATO and its partners working on approximately 350 research activities conducted by these Technical Teams.

The Applied Vehicle Technology Panel

The mission of the Applied Vehicle Technology Panel, comprising more than 1000 scientists and engineers, is to improve the performance, reliability, affordability, and safety of vehicles through advancement of appropriate technologies. The Panel addresses platform technologies for vehicles operating in all domains (land, sea, air, and space), for both new and ageing systems.

To accomplish this mission the members of the AVT community exploit their joint expertise in the fields of:

 Mechanical systems, structures and materials
 Propulsion and power systems
 Performance, stability and control, fluid physics

The Human Factors and Medicine Panel

The mission of the Human Factors and Medicine Panel is to provide the science and technology base for optimizing health, human protection, well-being and performance of the human in operational environments with consideration of affordability. This involves understanding and ensuring the physical, physiological, psychological and cognitive compatibility among military personnel, technological systems, missions, and environments. This is accomplished by exchange of information, collaborative experiments, and shared field trials.

To address the broad range of S&T areas of strategic importance to the HFM Panel and to support the Panel's operations, the HFM Panel consists two Areas:

 Human Systems and Behavior Area which explores new procedures and technologies for optimizing the performance of individuals, teams and organizations and their interaction with socio-technical systems to achieve effective mission performance. Examples of topics include human-machine interfaces, leadership, training, cultural and gender issues.
 Health, Medicine and Protection Area which is focused on developing an operationally fit and healthy force, restoring health, minimizing disease and injury, as well as optimizing human protection. It covers topics such as medical diagnosis, prevention, treatment and evacuation, as well as human protection research against environmental stressors e.g. cold, heat, air pressure, noise, vibration, CBRN

The Information Systems Technology Panel

The mission of the IST Panel is to advance and exchange techniques and technologies in order to improve C3I systems, with a special focus on Artificial Intelligence (AI), Interoperability and Cyber Security.

The Panel focuses on the advancement and exchange of techniques and technologies in order to provide timely, affordable, dependable, secure and relevant information to war fighters, planners and strategists, as well as enabling technologies for modelling, simulation, and training. IST's scope of responsibility covers the fields of Information Warfare and Assurance, Information and Knowledge Management, Communications and Networks, and Architecture and Enabling Technologies.

The IST Programme of Work is organized under three Focus Groups:

 Information and Knowledge Management (IWA)
 Architecture and Intelligence Information Systems (AI2S)
 Communications & Networks (COM)

The System Analysis and Studies Panel

The System Analysis and Studies (SAS) Panel conducts studies and analysis for better decisions in strategy, capability development, and operations within NATO, NATO Nations, and partner Nations.

The Panel leverages its broad range of analysis capabilities to provide decision support at all levels and in different areas, namely it identifies and assesses the impacts of geo-political drivers; regional contexts; futures; and technology changes to support policy and strategy decisions. SAS conducts analysis to improve operational tactics, training and procedures, develops better methods to support operational planning, and supports the development of systems, force element and enabler capability options, including the collection and collation of cost and performance data and defining the necessary missions for these individual systems and capabilities.

Key drivers in the SAS Panel's work are the exploitation of new technologies, new forms of organization, and new concepts of operation.

The focus of the Panel is on undertaking Operations Analysis activities related to challenges in the evolving strategic environment and the responses that both individual nations and NATO as a whole are making to tackle them.

The research can be divided into four focus areas:

 Policy and Strategy Decision Support
 Operations Decision Support
 Capability and Investment Decision Support
 Development and Maintenance of Analysis Capabilities

Activities include the development of analytical methods to address upcoming security challenges; information exchange on OA modelling concepts and best practice; research into new methodological approaches; and the development and exchange of models.

The Systems Concepts and Integration Panel

The mission of the Systems, Concepts and Integration (SCI) Panel is to advance knowledge concerning advanced system concepts, integration, engineering techniques and technologies across the spectrum of platforms and operating environments to assure cost-effective mission area capabilities. The Panel's research covers Integrated defence systems, including air, land, sea, and space systems (manned and unmanned), and associated weapon and countermeasure integration Its activities focus on NATO and national mid to long-term system level operational needs.

The scope of Panel activities covers a multidisciplinary range of theoretical concepts, design, development, and evaluation methods applied to integrated defence systems. Areas of interest include:

 Integrated mission systems including weapons and countermeasures.
 System architecture/mechanization.
 Vehicle integration.
 Mission management.
 System engineering technologies and testing.

The Sensors and Electronic Technology Panel

The Sensors & Electronics Technology (SET) Panel's mission is to advance technology in electronics and passive/active sensors, as they pertain to reconnaissance, surveillance, target acquisition, electronic warfare, communications, navigation, and to enhance sensor capabilities through multi-sensor integration/fusion in order to improve the operating capability and to contribute to fulfil strategic military results.

Research in the Sensors and Electronics Technology Panel concerns the phenomenology related to target signature, propagation and battle-space environment, electro-optics (or electro-optical, EO), radio frequency (RF), acoustic and magnetic sensors, antenna, signal and image processing, data fusion, autonomous sensing, position navigation and timing (PNT), components, sensor hardening and electromagnetic compatibility.

The SET Panel is organized into three Focus Groups:

 Radio Frequency Technology (RFT)
 Optical Technology (OT)
 Multi-Sensors & Electronics (MSE)

The NATO Modelling and Simulation Group 
The NATO Modelling and Simulation Group (NMSG) is the STO Scientific and Technical Committee in which all NATO Modelling and Simulation (M&S) stakeholders and subject matter experts meet to coordinate and oversee the implementation of the NATO M&S Master Plan (NMSMP).

The NMSMP is a NAC-approved NATO policy document that provides strategic vision and guidance for coordinating and utilizing M&S in NATO.

History 
In November 1996, the Conference of National Armaments Directors (CNAD) established a Steering Group on NATO Simulation Policy and Applications with a mandate to craft an Alliance approach to simulation in order to improve Alliance operations (e.g. defence planning, training, exercises, support to operations, research, technology development and armaments acquisition modernization) cost-effectively. The CNAD specifically tasked the Steering Group to identify recommended technical standards in order to foster simulation interoperability and reuse, to craft a roadmap for the development of simulations in order to satisfy the most-pressing NATO needs, and to include these results in a comprehensive NATO Modelling & Simulation Master Plan (MSMP). The MSMP would in turn guide the Alliance in the development and use of modelling and simulation (M&S).

The Steering Group accomplished its work with the broad and active participation of senior government policy representatives, the NATO Military Authorities and M&S experts drawn from the NATO member governments and the NATO Industrial Advisory Group. The Master Plan is the result of their endeavours

This NATO M&S Master Plan was endorsed by the Conference of NATO Armament Directors (CNAD) and the Military Committee (MC) in November 1998, and approved by the North Atlantic Council in December 1998. The M&S Master Plan recommended two organisational structures: the NATO Modelling & Simulation Group (as a level 2 body reporting to the RTB) and the establishment of a full-time Modelling & Simulation Co-ordination Office (MSCO) providing scientific, executive and administrative support to NMSG

Mission

The mission of the NMSG is to promote co-operation among Alliance bodies, NATO, and partner nations to maximize the effective utilization of M&S. This includes M&S standardization, education, and associated science and technology. The NMSG, as nominated by the Conference of National Armaments Directors (CNAD), is the delegated tasking authority for standardization in the NATO modelling and simulation domain.

The NMSMP articulates the NATO vision and guiding principles regarding the use of M&S in support of the NATO mission, discusses the impact that achieving this vision will have on NATO M&S application areas and identifies the governance mechanisms and bodies, and the primary NATO M&S stakeholders.

Under the umbrella of establishing a common technical framework, increasing interoperability and developing models, simulations and standards for M&S, the main current and future focus areas of work are:

 education and training
 decision making
 AI & Big Data
 cyber defence
 acquisition

The NMSG has three permanent sub-groups:

 the Military Operational Requirements Subgroup
 the M&S Standards Subgroup
 the Planning and Programmes Committee

The Centre for Maritime Research and Experimentation (CMRE) 
CMRE is NATO's knowledge repository for maritime S&T, offering a trusted platform for NATO Nations and partners to work together and to share science and technology. CMRE provides a science and technology framework through which NATO realizes the benefits of ownership by enforcing the values of the Alliance while reducing risks, costs, and aligning national interests and ambitions. The intellectual capital thus generated has great value in creating operational advantage and equipping the future force.

CMRE conducts relevant, state-of-the-art scientific research in ocean science, modelling and simulation, acoustics and other disciplines, that is potentially game changing.

CMRE contributes new technologies enabling access to unmanned systems that have the ability to sense, comprehend, predict, communicate, plan, make decisions and take appropriate actions to achieve mission goals. This provides operators with new technologies across the spectrum of expeditionary kinetic and non-kinetic capabilities required to defeat traditional threats decisively and confront irregular challenges effectively. CMRE also provides Science & Technology enhancements to unmanned vehicles and vessels, integrated defence systems, and autonomous intelligent systems that better enable operators to complete missions in hostile environments by avoiding, defeating and surviving attacks.

Advice 

The NATO Chief Scientist serves two roles: as scientific advisor to senior NATO leadership and as Chair of the STB. This advice is sourced from the collective STO programmes and the underlying knowledge base and then synthesised and integrated in a timely manner for political and military decision-makers. The STO Office of the Chief Scientist (OCS, embedded within NATO HQ) supports the NATO Chief Scientist in both roles and provides secretarial support to the STB.

How the work is Organized 
Each Panel/Group's Programme of Work is carried out by Technical Teams made up of national experts.

Prior to launching a Technical Team, when a Panel/Group believes that a particular expertise is required to assist or advise it on the technical merit or feasibility of a specific proposal, an Exploratory Team (ET) is established in order to carry out a feasibility study to establish whether it is worth starting a larger activity. The step of involving an ET is sometimes omitted if the idea has a strong support and can go straight into one of the technical activities listed below.

Technical Teams are assigned by the Panels/Group to perform specific tasks, such as:

 Research Task Group (RTG): technical team activity that allows researchers from different nations to work together in order to solve a particular scientific research and technology development problem. RTGs are sponsored by the Panel/Group to meet the needs of NATO. RTGs are chartered for a maximum of three years after the initial meeting. Among the activities conducted during an RTG, a Cooperative Demonstration of Technology (CDT) may be organized. The findings are documented in an STO publication (Technical Report or Technical Memoranda).
 Research Lecture Series (RLS): technical team activity that aims at disseminating state-of-the-art scientific knowledge among junior and mid-level specialists, scientists and engineers in military-relevant domains that are not taught in universities. An RLS is a two-day educational event that is normally organized at three different locations. RLSs can include a roundtable discussion. RLSs are combined with an STO publication (Educational Notes)
 Research Technical Course (RTC): an educational technical team activity aimed at transferring practical knowledge and recent field developments through on-site instructor training or lectures to military decision makers. The material is tailored to a specific/specialized audience and is generally more operational in nature than for a Research Lecture Series (RLS). An RTC can be offered up to a maximum of four times lasting from one to three days. The STO publication is not always provided for an RTC.
 Research Workshop (RWS): technical team activity that aims at facilitating intensive information exchange and focused discussion on a specific topic among a limited number of invited experts. The prime purpose of an RWS is to enhance the capability of the NATO S&T community to respond adequately to the military requirements of NATO. An RWS (generally not more than 30 participants) is a two to three-day event with no prescribed format. An RWS results in an STO publication (Meeting Proceedings).
 Research Specialists’ Meeting (RSM): technical team activity that exchanges state of the-art knowledge among an audience of specialists with invited speakers on an important scientific or applied topic. The prime purpose of an RSM is to enhance the capability of the NATO S&T community to respond adequately to the military requirements of NATO. An RSM is a medium-scale (usually less than 100 participants), two to three-day event. An RSM results in an STO publication (Meeting Proceedings).
 AGARDograph (Advanced Guidance for Alliance Research and Development – AGARD) pertains to a single, clearly defined technical subject and comprises material generally agreed to be of lasting interest and value to the technical and war fighter communities represented throughout NATO. The AG material may be the work of a single author or be the coordinated and edited contributions of several authors. An AG team is chartered for a maximum of three years.
 Long-Term Scientific Study (LTSS): technical team activity that provides recommendations to NATO and National Authorities based on assessment of the impact on military operations that might be expected from developments in science and technology over both the medium and long term (typically 10 – 20 years). This would include how emerging technologies, systems and methods may affect tactical concepts and doctrines. LTSS are chartered for three years after the initial meeting. Among the activities conducted during an LTSS, a brainstorming meeting, called Multinational Exercise (MNE), is organized. An LTSS results in an STO publication (Technical Report) and in presentations to various NATO or National Authorities.
 Military Application Study (MAS): technical team activity is a short-term rapid reaction study that assesses the application of technology to operational procedures to solve operational and equipment deficiencies

Scientific publications 

To complement the technical activities the STO publishes a series of scientific reports and studies, most of which are available via the STO Website Publications.

Further reading 

 Theodore von Kármán with Lee Edson (1967) The Wind and Beyond: Theodore von Kármán Pioneer in Aviation and Pathfinder in Space: Little, Brown and Company
 The AGARD History 1952-1987 (1999), Advisory Group for Aerospace Research & Development, 
 2021 Programme of Work
 Theodore von Kármán

External links 

 https://www.sto.nato.int
 https://www.cmre.nato.int

References 

NATO